Pearls Bring Tears is a 1937 British comedy drama film directed by Manning Haynes and starring John Stuart, Dorothy Boyd and Googie Withers.

Plot
Madge Hart (Dorothy Boyd) borrows a pearl necklace to wear to a dance, but then accidentally breaks it. She is further concerned because the pearls were only on loan to her husband as security for a business deal. Madge then rushes the necklace to be repaired, but when it is stolen, further panic ensues.

Cast
John Stuart as Harry Willshire
Dorothy Boyd as Madge Hart
Eve Gray as Pamela Vane
Mark Stone as George Hart
Googie Withers as Doreen
Aubrey Mallalieu as Mr. Vane
Annie Esmond as Mrs. Vane
H.F. Maltby as Mr. Duffield
Hal Walters as Albert
Syd Crossley as Parkes
Isobel Scaife as Mary
Michael Ripper as Jeweller's Assistant (uncredited)

Critical reception
TV Guide gave the film two out of four stars, calling it "A fast-paced and surprisingly witty comedy."

References

External links

1937 films
1937 comedy-drama films
British comedy-drama films
British black-and-white films
1930s English-language films
Films directed by H. Manning Haynes
1930s British films